Tropical Storm Georgette was a short-lived tropical storm that struck Baja California Sur in September 2010. Georgette originated from an area of disturbed weather over the eastern Pacific ocean on September 20. The next day, the system was upgraded into a tropical storm a short distance south of Baja California Sur. As the storm moved over the peninsula, it weakened to a tropical depression. It continued north and as such made landfall on mainland Mexico on September 22. Georgette dissipated early the next day while located inland over Sonora. Although officials noted the threat for heavy rainfall across northwest Mexico and Baja California, damage was minimal and no deaths were reported in the country. However, remnant moisture moved into New Mexico, producing flooding that killed one person.

Meteorological history

The origins of Tropical Storm Georgette were from a tropical wave that moved off the west coast of Africa on September 1. Lacking organization, the wave was difficult to track as it moved across the Atlantic basin. Convection eventually increased on September 7, as the system approached the Lesser Antilles. On September 14, Hurricane Karl developed from the northern portion of the system over the western Caribbean Sea; however, the southern portion of the wave crossed northern Central America and entered the Pacific Ocean on September 17. The area of disturbed weather was first mentioned on the National Hurricane Center (NHC) around that time, but signification development was initially not anticipated. Wind shear was forecast to decrease slightly; however, and based on this the NHC gave the system a medium chance of undergoing tropical cyclogenesis during the next two days.

Gradual development took place as convection consolidated around the center of circulation while located west of Sonora. During the afternoon of September 20, an area of low pressure developed within the system, prompting the NHC to classify it as a tropical depression. At this time, the depression was situated roughly 240 mi (390 km) south-southeast of Cabo San Lucas. Situated along the western edge of a subtropical ridge, the system was steered towards the north-northwest throughout its existence.

Within hours of becoming a depression on September 20, strong wind shear caused convection to diminish. However, data from an ASCAT scatterometer pass revealed that the system attained gale-force winds, resulting in the depression being upgraded to a tropical storm on 0000 UTC September 21. Operationally, the first advisory on storm was not issued until 1200 UTC, where it was named Georgette. Meanwhile, thunderstorm activity increased near the center of the storm. Little change took place throughout the day as the storm approached Baja California Sur. Around 1800 UTC, Georgette made landfall near San Jose del Cabo with winds of 40 mph (65 km/h). Additionally, a barometric pressure of 999 mbar (hPa; 29.5 inHg) was measured. Shortly before entering the Gulf of California, Georgette weakened to a tropical depression. Maintaining winds of 35 mph (55 km/h), the storm later made a second landfall near San Carlos in Sonora. Shortly after moving inland, the low-level circulation dissipated over the mountains of western Mexico.

Preparations and impact

Prior to the arrival of Georgette, the Mexican government issued a tropical storm warning for extreme southern Baja California Sur., but was dropped when Georgette moved inland. Officials warned rural areas in Baja California Sur of heavy rain and high wind. Forecasters at the NHC noted the potential for up to 10 in (25 mm) of rainfall, especially over the higher terrain. The forecasters also noted potential for deadly flooding and mudslides. Officials evacuated over 1,000 families from floodplains and opened four shelters in Los Cabos.

In Sonora, the state's civil protection committee placed the south portion of the state under an "orange" alert, and a "red" alert soon after; the alert was lifted that same evening, after Georgette moved inland. A total of 52 shelters were opened in the Cajeme municipality. In Guaymas, 300 people from the city and surrounding areas were placed in shelters; 250 more people sought shelter from Georgette in Empalme. Schools in Bahía Kino and coastal areas of the Hermosillo Municipality suspended classes as a precaution. Classes resumed statewide on September 23.

Georgette caused the heaviest rains on Baja California Sur in the last 15 years, leaving many people homeless. Georgette also produced high waves. The tropical cyclone worsened Mexico's flooding problem which started when Hurricane Karl made landfall several days earlier. A peak rainfall total of  fell in Todos Santos. Throughout Sonora, rainfall up to  triggered flooding that damaged 220 homes. Georgette caused  of rainfall in Guaymas Flooding was reported in several places (Empalme, Etchojoa, Navojoa, Guaymas, Los Mochis), causing 500,000 people to be evacuated. Heavy runoff caused inflows of  into El Novillo Dam, forcing the Comisión Nacional del Agua, the local water authorities, to release water from the dam.

Moisture from the system combined with an approaching trough to produce heavy rainfall and thunderstorms across New Mexico. The rains caused flooding that killed a person along the Rio Grande near Carnuel.

See also

Other storms of the same name
2010 Pacific hurricane season
List of tropical cyclone names

References

2010 in Mexico
2010 Pacific hurricane season
Eastern Pacific tropical storms
Georgette